Individuality (Can I Be Me?) is the third studio album by American vocalist Rachelle Ferrell. It was released on August 15, 2000 through Capitol Records. Recording sessions took place at Le Gonks West and Andora Recording Studio in Los Angeles, at The Blue Room in Philadelphia, and at O'Henry Sound Studios in Burbank. All songs overdubbed and mixed by Erik Zobler at Le Gonks West, a studio owned by George Duke, who served as producer of the album. It features guest appearances from Jonathan Butler and Russ Barnes.

The album peaked at number 71 on the Billboard 200 albums chart, at number 16 on the Top R&B/Hip-Hop Albums chart and at number 1 on the Jazz Albums chart in the United States. Individuality (Can I Be Me?) spawned two singles: "Satisfied" and "I Forgive You". Both singles made it to the Adult R&B Songs chart, reaching #11 and #13 respectively.

Track listing

Personnel

Rachelle Ferrell – vocals, lyrics, producer (track 3), executive producer
Jonathan Butler – vocals, guitar (track 7)
Russ Barnes – vocals (track 9), backing vocals (tracks: 1, 6)
Kenny Lattimore – backing vocals (tracks: 1, 6)
Jef Lee Johnson – lyrics (track 1), guitar (tracks: 1–6, 8, 9, 11), bass & keyboards (tracks: 1, 3), producer (track 3), recording (tracks: 1, 3)
George Duke – keyboards (tracks: 2–11), keyboard bass & guitar (tracks: 1, 3), producer (tracks: 1, 2, 4–11)
Tony Maiden – guitar (track 11)
Byron Lee Miller – bass (tracks: 4–6, 8, 11)
John "Lil' John" Roberts – drums (tracks: 1–3, 9, 10)
Ricardo Jordan – drums (tracks: 4–7, 11)
Lenny Castro – percussion (tracks: 4–6, 8, 9)
Technical
Erik Zobler – recording (tracks: 2, 4–11), mixing
Wayne Holmes – assistant engineering
Rob Brill – assistant engineering (tracks: 4–6, 8)
Bryan Jackson – assistant engineering (tracks: 4–6, 8)
James Stone – assistant engineering (track 11)
Tommy Steele – art direction
Norman Moore – design
Ann Smalley – design
Beth Herzhaft – photography
Corine Duke – production coordinator
Kent Blackwelder Management – management

Chart history

References

External links 

Individuality (Can I Be Me?) by Rachelle Ferrell on iTunes

2000 albums
Capitol Records albums
Albums produced by George Duke